Stephen M. Wolf (born 1941, California) assumed his current position as chairman of R. R. Donnelley & Sons Company in March 2004. He has been the managing partner of Alpilles, LLC, since April 1, 2003. In April 2009 he became chairman of Trilantic Capital Partners, which was previously Lehman Brothers Merchant Banking. Before becoming managing partner of Alpilles, Wolf was chairman of US Airways. Wolf was chairman and chief executive officer (CEO) of US Airways from January 16, 1996, until November 18, 1998, when he turned over his CEO title to another executive. Wolf was responsible for the company's rebranding to US Airways from its previous identity, USAir. During Wolf's tenure, US Airways also placed an order for up to 400 Airbus A320-series narrow-body aircraft, with 120 firm orders at the time of the order signing; at the time, the order was regarded as the largest bulk aircraft request in history. Prior to joining US Airways, Wolf had served since 1994 as senior advisor to Lazard Frères. From 1987 until it was purchased by its employees in July 1994 he was chairman and chief executive officer of UAL Corporation and United Airlines, Inc.

Wolf's aviation career began in 1966 with American Airlines, where he rose to the position of vice president of the western division. He joined Pan American World Airways as a senior vice president in 1981 and became president and chief operating officer of Continental Airlines in 1982. In 1984, he became president and CEO of Republic Airlines (1979-1986), where he served until 1986, at which time he orchestrated the company's merger with Northwest Airlines. Thereafter, he served as chairman and CEO of Tiger International, Inc. and Flying Tiger Line, where he oversaw the sale of the company to Federal Express. Wolf serves as a member of the board of directors of R. R. Donnelley & Sons Company, Philip Morris International, and Chrysler Group, LLC, and is an honorary trustee of The Brookings Institution.

Wolf holds a bachelor's degree in sociology from San Francisco State University.

Personal life
Wolf is a native of California, where he attended high school in Oakland and attended college at San Francisco State University. Wolf married his wife Delores, a former American Airlines executive, in 1986. The couple is known to have lived in Chicago during Stephen's chairmanship of United Airlines; they later constructed a stone and brick house featuring an 1,800 bottle wine cellar on farmland in McLean, Virginia. In 2013 the couple purchased a Moroccan style, 242 square meter (2,600 square foot), 2-bedroom condominium in the Dunster House complex at 360 S. Ocean Blvd. in Palm Beach. Both Stephen and Delores are self declared Francophiles.

The 198 cm (6'6") Wolf is known for his distinctive appearance, consisting of his characteristic round tortoiseshell eyeglasses, red suspenders, and Hungarian-style moustache. He also owns a collection of Jaguar automobiles.

Wolf has donated more than $16,000 to Republican causes since 1990, including the political campaigns of John McCain, Thomas M. Davis, Sue Lowden, Lauch Faircloth, Linda Lingle, Josh Mandel, Lynn Morley Martin, Michael Castle, and John Warner.

References

1941 births
Living people
American chief operating officers
American airline chief executives
San Francisco State University alumni
20th-century American businesspeople